The 1912–13 Divizia A was the fourth season of Divizia A, the top-level football league of Romania.

Final table

References

1912-13
1912–13 in European association football leagues
1912–13 in Romanian football